Charles A. Barnard (March 3, 1907 – November 2, 1956) was a member of the Wisconsin State Assembly.

Biography
Barnard was born on March 3, 1907, in Brillion, Wisconsin. He graduated from Brillion High School before attending Lawrence University, the University of Wisconsin, and Marquette University Law School and becoming a lawyer. In 1931, he married Cecelia Lynch. They had two children. Barnard was a member of the Benevolent and Protective Order of Elks and the Knights of Columbus. He died at his home in Oshkosh, Wisconsin on November 2, 1956, following a myocardial infarction.

Political career
Barnard was a member of the Assembly from 1929 to 1930. He was also a delegate to the 1932 Republican National Convention.

References

People from Brillion, Wisconsin
Politicians from Oshkosh, Wisconsin
Republican Party members of the Wisconsin State Assembly
Wisconsin lawyers
Lawrence University alumni
University of Wisconsin–Madison alumni
Marquette University Law School alumni
1907 births
1956 deaths
20th-century American lawyers
20th-century American politicians